Brian Phillips may refer to:

 Brian Phillips (footballer) (1931–2012), English professional footballer
 Brian Phillips (swimmer) (born 1954), Canadian former swimmer